"Truth" is a song by South Korean pop-rock idol band CNBLUE. It was released on April 23, 2014, as their seventh single under Warner Music Japan and 10th single overall in Japan. The song was written by Jung Yong-hwa and miwa, along with Ryo and Lee Sang-ho.

The single was released in four editions: Regular Edition, Limited Editions A and B, and a fan club-only Boice Limited Edition. "Truth" debuted on the weekly Oricon Singles Chart at number four and has sold nearly 40,000 copies since its release. The band embarked on the CNBLUE Spring Live 2014 "Truth" arena tour, where they held three concerts in Yokohama and Osaka.

Composition
"Truth" was written by frontman Jung Yong-hwa and miwa; it was composed by Jung, Ryo, and Lee Sang-ho, the lattermost arranging the song. "Still" delves into the antagonist's inability to "get over his breakup with a lover". Both tracks are love songs.

Release and promotion
"Truth" was announced as CNBLUE's seventh single on March 13, 2014, with a release date of April 23. A 30-second preview of the music video for "Truth" was uploaded on  Warner Music Japan's YouTube channel on March 27, 2014. The full music video was published on April 4. The song was released as a digital download on April 9. A music video for the coupling track "Still" was also published on April 15.

"Truth" was released on April 23 in four editions: Regular Edition; Limited Edition A with bonus DVD content that includes multi-angle performance footage of "Blind Love", "Robot", and "Lady" from CNBLUE's Zepp Tour 2013 "Lady" at Zepp Tokyo, the music video for "Truth", and its special feature; Limited Edition B with bonus DVD content that includes performance footage of "Where You Are", "Wake Up", "Let’s Go Crazy", and "Robot" from the band's set at the 2013 Rock in Japan Festival and its special feature; and Boice Limited Edition with bonus DVD content that includes the music video for "Still" and a special feature.

The band embarked on the CNBLUE Spring Live 2014 "Truth" arena tour concerts, which took place from April 29–30 in Yokohama at the Yokohama Arena and on May 20 in Osaka at the Osaka-jō Hall.

Commercial performance
"Truth" sold 27,372 copies in its first day of release and ranked number three on the daily Oricon Singles Chart. On the issue dated May 23, 2014, the single debuted at number four on the weekly Oricon Singles Chart, selling 35,602 copies in its first week. On the same issue date, the song debuted at number seven on the Billboard Japan Hot 100. By the end of its chart run, "Truth" sold 39,826 copies in Japan.

Track listing

Charts

References

External links

2014 singles
2014 songs
CNBLUE songs
Japanese-language songs
Songs written by Jung Yong-hwa
Warner Music Japan singles